Pristavica is a small settlement in the Municipality of Rogaška Slatina in eastern Slovenia. It lies on the right bank of the Sotla River, on the border with Croatia. The area belongs to the traditional Styria region and is now included in the Savinja Statistical Region.

References

External links
Pristavica on Geopedia

Populated places in the Municipality of Rogaška Slatina